KYAV-LD, VHF digital channel 12, is a low-powered television station serving the Palm Springs, California area. Owned by the News-Press & Gazette Company, it is a sister station to KESQ-TV, KPSP-CD, KDFX-CD, KCWQ-LD and KUNA-LD.

History

Founded July 25, 1990, KYAV-LD has been previously affiliated with CNC, a Spanish-language news channel based in Colombia, and Mas Musica, the 24-hour Spanish-language music video channel.

It has been an Azteca America affiliate since May 2003 and was purchased by Desert Television in August 2004, owner of local CBS affiliate KPSP-CD, although the station operates under the licensee U-Dub Productions LLC based in Yucca Valley, California. The company used to operate another Azteca America station, a low-power feeder for the Victor Valley, California on channel 19. 

On October 18, 2009, the then-KYAV-LP went out of business and the signal ceased operations. On February 22, 2012, the station changed its call sign to KYAV-LD. The station became an AccuWeather affiliate, a 24-hour live weather network features weather reports and forecasts.

In January 2012, News-Press & Gazette Company acquired the non-license assets of KYAV and KPSP; a year later, it purchased the stations' licenses outright. The deals made KYAV a sister station to ABC affiliate KESQ-TV and Telemundo affiliate KUNA-LP, among other stations.

As of 2019, the AccuWeather affiliation (which has been discontinued from most of its affiliates by this point) has been dropped in favor of a "News" format.

Digital channels
The station's digital signal is multiplexed:

References

External links

YAV-LD
Television channels and stations established in 1990
Low-power television stations in the United States